Fabian Hernando Puerta Zapata (born 12 July 1991) is a Colombian track cyclist. He competed in keirin at the 2012 Summer Olympics in London and in keirin at the 2011 Pan American Games where he won a gold medal. He is married to fellow track cyclist Juliana Gaviria, and is brother in law to former track World Champion and Giro D'Italia points classification winner Fernando Gaviria.

Sanctions
On 14 August 2018 the Union Cycliste Internationale announced that it had notified Fabian Hernando Puerta Zapata of an Adverse Analytical Finding (AAF) of boldenone in a sample collected in the scope of an out-of-competition control on 11 June 2018.
In accordance with UCI Anti-Doping Rules, Puerta was provisionally suspended until the adjudication of the affair.
On 29 August 2019 the UCI announced a four-year Anti-Doping Rule Violation (ADRV) of Fabian Hernando Puerta Zapata. The ADRV Date was 11 June 2018, and the period of ineligibility is until 12 August 2022.

Major results

2010
 Central American and Caribbean Games
1st 1 km time trial
2nd Team sprint
 Pan American Road and Track Championships
 1st team sprint
2011
 Pan American Games
 1st Keirin
 2nd Sprint
 3rd Team sprint
2012
 Pan American Road and Track Championships
 1st Keirin
 3rd Sprint
 Track Cycling World Cup
 1st 1 km time trial, Round 1, Cali
 1st Keirin, Round 1, Cali
 2nd Sprint, Round 1, Cali
2013
 Pan American Road and Track Championships
 1st Keirin
 1st 1 km time trial
 2nd Flying lap
 Copa Cobernador de Carabobo
 1st Sprint
 1st Keirin

References

External links

1991 births
Living people
Colombian male cyclists
Cyclists at the 2012 Summer Olympics
Cyclists at the 2016 Summer Olympics
Cyclists at the 2011 Pan American Games
Olympic cyclists of Colombia
People from Antioquia Department
Keirin cyclists
Pan American Games gold medalists for Colombia
Pan American Games silver medalists for Colombia
Pan American Games medalists in cycling
Cyclists at the 2015 Pan American Games
Central American and Caribbean Games gold medalists for Colombia
Central American and Caribbean Games silver medalists for Colombia
UCI Track Cycling World Champions (men)
Sportspeople from Bogotá
Colombian track cyclists
South American Games gold medalists for Colombia
South American Games medalists in cycling
Competitors at the 2010 South American Games
Competitors at the 2010 Central American and Caribbean Games
Central American and Caribbean Games medalists in cycling
Medalists at the 2011 Pan American Games
Medalists at the 2015 Pan American Games
20th-century Colombian people
21st-century Colombian people
Competitors at the 2014 Central American and Caribbean Games
Competitors at the 2018 Central American and Caribbean Games